Jacqueline Fatima Bocoum is a former journalist turned author from the West African state of Senegal. She is also the director of the media company Com 7.
As a journalist, Jacqueline worked for R.T.S. and Sud FM before becoming Programme Director and Director of Information at Radio Nostalfie. 
From a political perspective, her father was a bureaucrat under President Léopold Sédar Senghor. Jacqueline lays a critical eye on her father's administrative position as one typical product of the political structure prevalent during those times, in the foreword of her first novel. She, however, has an undeniable admiration for him.

Publications
Motus et bouche ... décousue (Words and Secrets), Xamal (2002),

References

Living people
Senegalese novelists
Year of birth missing (living people)
Senegalese journalists
20th-century Senegalese writers
Senegalese women journalists
Senegalese women novelists